Hamit Altıntop (born 8 December 1982) is a Turkish former professional footballer and current board member of the Turkish Football Federation. He was a versatile midfielder who could play either in a defending or attacking role and on both flanks, known for his creative flair and long-range shooting ability. He is the identical twin brother of footballer Halil Altıntop, who was born 10 minutes after Hamit.

Altıntop was part of the Turkey squad that reached the semi-finals of Euro 2008. After the tournament he was voted as part of the 23-man Team of the tournament awards. He won the 2010 FIFA Puskás Award for scoring the best goal of the season in a UEFA Euro 2012 qualifying match against Kazakhstan in a 3–0 win for his country.

Club career

Schalke

Altıntop started his professional career in local German club Wattenscheid in 2000 along with his brother. As successful performances grabbed the attention of bigger clubs, he was transferred to Schalke 04 in 2003, where he played in a primarily defensive midfield role. In the 2006–07 summer transfer window, Schalke signed his brother Halil from Kaiserslautern. Schalke came second in the Bundesliga, only pipped by VfB Stuttgart by two points.

Bayern Munich

Altıntop joined Bayern Munich for the 2007–08 season on a free transfer from Schalke 04. He scored his first goal in his first game for Bayern when they faced the Brazilian champions São Paulo. Munich went on winning the game 2–1 after his spectacular free-kick. Remaining as one of Munich's starters, he scored another left-foot goal out of 30 meters distance against Werder Bremen in the DFL-Ligapokal. Munich completed the match with a 4–1 victory.

Altıntop also scored a controversial penalty against Aberdeen in the first leg of their tie in the UEFA Cup competition on 14 February 2008 at Pittodrie. The initial penalty kick was saved by Aberdeen goalkeeper Jamie Langfield; however, Altıntop scored with the rebound. The match finished 2–2.

In 2009–10 season, Bayern Munich competed in Champions League and they eventually went to 2010 UEFA Champions League Final, which was played at the Santiago Bernabéu Stadium, home of Real Madrid on Saturday, 22 May 2010. He started the match in the first 11, but he was substituted for Miroslav Klose, on 63rd minute.

On 2 June 2010, Altıntop signed a new one-year contract with Bayern Munich. He was eventually released by Bayern during the end of the 2010–11 season, after failing to negotiate an extension to his contract. Thus, he became a free agent.

Real Madrid
On 19 May 2011, it was announced Altıntop would move on a free transfer to Real Madrid. He signed a four-year contract with the Spanish club. He made his debut for the club on 27 September at the Santiago Bernabéu in a Champions League match against AFC Ajax, coming on in the 84th minute as a replacement for Mesut Özil. He made his La Liga debut for the club on 15 October at the Santiago Bernabéu in a match against Real Betis, coming on in the 78th minute as a replacement for Cristiano Ronaldo. He scored his first goal for the club on 18 December at the Estadio Ramón Sánchez in a match against Sevilla FC on the 89th minute from an assist from Xabi Alonso, coming on in the 86th minute as a replacement for Karim Benzema. He made his first starting debut for the club on 28 January 2012 at the Santiago Bernabéu in a victory over Zaragoza, playing a full match. He made his first Champions League starting debut for the club on 4 April 2012 at the Santiago Bernabéu in a 2011–12 Champions League quarter-finals match against APOEL F.C., playing a full match.

Galatasaray
On 13 July 2012, he signed a four-year contract with the Galatasaray SK for €3.5 million from Real Madrid. Altıntop would earn €2.4 million per-season in 2012–13 and 2013–14 in addition to a €20,000 per-match bonus. He made his Galatasaray debut on 12 August 2012 in the 2012 Turkish Super Cup final against the Turkish Cup Champions Fenerbahçe. Galatasaray won 3–2, winning the title for the 12th time. He made his Süper Lig debut the following week against Kasımpaşa. Altıntop's first goal for Galatasaray was a 30-meter free kick in the 37th minute of a Champions League defeat of former club Schalke 04 on 12 March 2013. Altintop failed to appear in Galatasaray's first 18 squad due to injuries during most of 2015 and 2016. He started reappearing in cup games. However, due to a disastrous performance against a second division club Tuzlaspor and the criticism of the supporters, the club decided to terminate his contract.

Darmstadt 98
On 31 January 2017, Altıntop signed a season long contract with Darmstadt 98. He was named the best player of the 20th matchday by the Bundesliga after contributing in major fashion to a surprise win against Borussia Dortmund. He parted ways with the club on 4 January 2018 due to personal reasons and moved to Turkey with his family.

International career
Altıntop played in all five of Turkey's matches at UEFA Euro 2008. He assisted all three goals in the comeback against the Czech Republic and in the quarter finals against Croatia he scored the third penalty to make it 3–1 in the shoot out. After goalkeeper Rüştü Reçber saved the next Croatian penalty, Turkey advanced to the semi-finals against Germany. Turkish coach Fatih Terim used him as a right defender in the first two games of the tournament, a move that was heavily criticized by the media, since Altıntop was a midfielder for his then-club Bayern Munich. After the match against Switzerland, Terim switched him to midfield for the remainder of the tournament, which boosted both Turkey's and his own performance. His bold playing style and decisive passes made him a dominant player in the Turkish midfield. He was awarded with the Carlsberg Man of the Match award following the quarter final match against Croatia. At the conclusion of the tournament, Altıntop was widely acknowledged to be one of the tournament's stars, and was included in UEFA's official 23-man "Team of the Tournament".

In January 2011, Altıntop won the FIFA Puskás Award for Goal of the Year of 2010 for his volley against Kazakhstan in September 2010 in a Euro 2012 qualifier.

He was captain of the national team for the first time on 30 March 2011 in a 2–0 victory against Austria.

Managerial career
In 2018, one year after his retirement from professional, he was elected as a board of directors member of the Turkish Football Federation.

Personal life
In 2014, Altıntop married Feyza Veli in a wedding ceremony in Istanbul's renowned Çırağan Palace.

Altintop has been nominated as the 2023 UEFA Champions League Final ambassador, since the final will be held at Atatürk Olympic Stadium in Istanbul.

Career statistics

Club
Source:

International
Source:

Scores and results table. Turkey's goal tally first:

Honours

Club
Schalke 04
DFL-Ligapokal: 2005
UEFA Intertoto Cup: 2003, 2004

Bayern Munich
Bundesliga: 2007–08, 2009–10
DFB-Pokal: 2007–08, 2009–10
DFL-Ligapokal: 2007
DFL-Supercup: 2010
UEFA Champions League runner-up: 2009–10

Real Madrid
La Liga: 2011–12

Galatasaray
Süper Lig: 2012–13, 2014–15
Turkish Cup: 2013–14, 2014–15
Turkish Super Cup: 2012, 2013, 2016

International
Turkey
 UEFA European Championship bronze medalist: 2008

Individual
 kicker Bundesliga Team of the Season: 2005–06
 FIFA Puskas Award: 2010
 UEFA European Championship Team of the Tournament: 2008

References

External links 

 

1982 births
Living people
Sportspeople from Gelsenkirchen
Turkish Muslims
German Muslims
Citizens of Turkey through descent
Turkish footballers
Turkey international footballers
Turkey under-21 international footballers
Turkey youth international footballers
German footballers
German people of Turkish descent
German expatriate sportspeople in Spain
Association football utility players
Association football midfielders
Bundesliga players
3. Liga players
Regionalliga players
SG Wattenscheid 09 players
FC Schalke 04 II players
FC Schalke 04 players
FC Bayern Munich II players
FC Bayern Munich footballers
SV Darmstadt 98 players
La Liga players
Real Madrid CF players
Süper Lig players
Galatasaray S.K. footballers
UEFA Euro 2008 players
Turkish expatriate footballers
Turkish expatriate sportspeople in Spain
Expatriate footballers in Spain
Identical twins
Twin sportspeople
Turkish twins
German twins
2. Bundesliga players
Footballers from North Rhine-Westphalia